Kidnapping in China has its history since the ancient times. Such issues have been heavily studied and discussed by investigators and researchers.

Since at least the 1980s, kidnapping has become a bigger issue than ever in the country. Since the 1990s, tougher laws against the kidnapping have been established. Chinese authorities have also investigated in this regard.

History

Ancient Chinese text indicates the ransoming of hostages during the reign of Xia Dynasty (2070 BC - 1600 BC), they refer to the taking of princes and family members as hostages across the multiple dynastic periods as warrantor of negotiated treaties.

There have been number of historical incidents of kidnapping in China, In 1523, when two Japanese rival delegations had arrived in Ningbo, they had looted and kidnapped Chinese civil servants. Due to such incident, the official relations with Japan were not restored until 1539.

During the Second Opium War, when an estimated of 18,000 British and French Soldiers had returned to the coastal forts, Chinese' response included the kidnapping of 38 Anglo-French negotiating party members, 26 of them died in captivity.

During World War II, thousands of Chinese were kidnapped by the Japanese and sent to Japan to work as forced laborers. Many Chinese were forced to work in deadly conditions at coal mines in Kyushu and Honshu.

In 2015, the Chinese government launched QGDGXQ, a system for identifying and reuniting freed children.

As of 2018, the Chinese government has notoriously kidnapped and imprisoned prominent businessmen including Yang Zhihui, Wu Xiaohui and Guo Guangchang. This is part of the crackdown on "market manipulation" yet critics condemn the actions of the Chinese government stating that they are breaking UN human rights regulations and censoring the freedom of speech in China.

Studies
During the 19th century, Johannes Von Gumpach had described the issue of kidnapping as "One of the most common crimes in China." According to Francis Dunlap Gamewell, kidnapping was a common crime in Shanghai; he noted that kidnappers were mostly female.

Carl Crow, who traveled to China during the wars, he had described the prevalence of kidnapping in China as "well organized business in China carried out with a large degree of success".

Prevalence

Kidnapping has become a growing business in China. Steve Vickers of Kroll Associates has reportedly noted that some common scenarios of kidnapping in China includes the kidnapping for ransom, kidnapping of a foreigner(commonly in Hong Kong or Macau).

Child abductions
An estimated 70,000 children are kidnapped in China every year, although the Chinese government reported fewer than 10,000 kidnappings. According to the United States Department of State, estimates are closer to 20,000.

Some children are reported to have been sold into adoption overseas. The adoption agencies of China receive considerable donations from foreign parents when they adopt, sometimes as much as $5,000; such agencies have been known to purchase children from human traffickers, although such cases are usually rare.

Kidnapping of foreign businessmen

In Guangdong, during the year 1994, the "economic crimes" topped the list of criminal cases, about 46 debt related hosted cases were acknowledged and investigated by the authorities. The chief procurator, Wang Jun had noted that at least 171 hostages involved in debt-related incidents had been freed by the authorities of Guangdong.

Crackdown

From the period of 1991 to 1996, Chinese police freed an estimated 88,000 kidnapped women and children. During this period, about 143,000 kidnappers were arrested.

In 2011, Chinese police asserted that they rescued over 13,000 children and 23,000 women in the last two years. Government officials had noted that they would impose harsher punishments on those who purchase kidnapped children.

In September 2013, Chinese security forces had rescued 92 children, and arrested 301 suspected kidnappers.

According to a report from October 2013, Beijing has tried to combat kidnappings. According to Xinhua news agency, since 2009, police have rescued over 54,000 children and eliminated 11,000 traffickers.

Law

Kidnapping is illegal in China. By 1991, the Standing Committee of the National People's Congress addressed for acting against the kidnapping for sale of women and children, kidnapping for blackmailing, purchase of abducted women and children, as well as the abuse of office to inhibit the rescue of kidnapped women and children.

Such concerns led to the familiarization of a criminal law. Per Article 141, penalties for the abduction, purchase, sale, and trafficking of women and children have taken place. Later in 1997, the penalties were increased.

See also
Forced disappearance#China
Extraordinary rendition#China
Lee Ming-che disappearances
Causeway Bay Books disappearances

References

External links
 Kidnapped and Sold: Inside the Dark World of Child Trafficking in China
 How To Avoid Getting Kidnapped In China
 Legal Protections of Women Rights in China

 
Crime in China